Uzi (also Romanized as Ūzī; also known as Yuzi) is a village in Bakrabad Rural District, in the Central District of Varzaqan County, East Azerbaijan Province, Iran. At the 2006 census, its population was 161, in 32 families.

References 

Towns and villages in Varzaqan County